İstasyon Bridge (literally "Station Bridge") is a historical bridge in Amasya,  Turkey. Formerly it was also called Meydan Bridge.

It is direction is from north to south.

According to Amasya municipality page, the bridge was constructed by Sadgeldi, the governor of Amasya between 1360 and 1382 who soon declared independence from the Eretnids. During the Ottoman Empire era the bridge was damaged in the 1824 flood and in 1825 earthquake. It was repaired in 1828 by Hacı Yusuf, the ayan of Amasya (governor). During the Turkish Republic, it underwent maintenance in 1940. 
It is a four-arch bridge. According to Fügen İlter, the bridge although constructed in 14th century, is quite different from the other bridges built in the post-Seljukid era.

References

Bridges completed in the 14th century
Arch bridges in Turkey
Buildings and structures in Amasya Province
Anatolia Beyliks bridges
Deck arch bridges